"The Heart of a Broken Story" is a short story by J. D. Salinger, published in the September 1941 issue of Esquire magazine. The story was one of Salinger's first commercial successes and brought him welcomed attention as a young author. In the story, he pokes fun at the formulaic boy-meets-girl stories that appear with regularity in many magazines during that era.  The only story to be narrated by Salinger himself, it nonetheless shows his unwillingness to control his characters.

References

1941 short stories
Short stories by J. D. Salinger
Works originally published in Esquire (magazine)